The Box Office Murders is a 1929 detective novel by the Irish-born writer Freeman Wills Crofts. It is the fifth in his series of novels featuring Inspector French, a prominent figure of the Golden Age of Detective Fiction. It was published in the United States the same year by Harper under the alternative title The Purple Sickle Murders.

Synopsis
French becomes involved in a case that sees several female cinema box office cashiers die in mysterious circumstances.

References

Bibliography
 Evans, Curtis. Masters of the "Humdrum" Mystery: Cecil John Charles Street, Freeman Wills Crofts, Alfred Walter Stewart and the British Detective Novel, 1920-1961. McFarland, 2014.
 Herbert, Rosemary. Whodunit?: A Who's Who in Crime & Mystery Writing. Oxford University Press, 2003.
 Reilly, John M. Twentieth Century Crime & Mystery Writers. Springer, 2015.

1929 British novels
Novels by Freeman Wills Crofts
British crime novels
British mystery novels
British thriller novels
British detective novels
Irish mystery novels
Irish crime novels
William Collins, Sons books
Novels set in London
Novels set in Hampshire